Wang Zhen (born 26 June 1989) is a Chinese cross-country mountain biker and road cyclist, who currently rides for UCI Continental team . At the 2014 Asian Games, he won the gold medal in the cross-country event at the Ganghwa Asiad BMX Track.

References

External links

Chinese mountain bikers
Chinese male cyclists
Asian Games medalists in cycling
Cyclists at the 2010 Asian Games
Cyclists at the 2014 Asian Games
Living people
1989 births
Asian Games gold medalists for China
Olympic cyclists of China
Cyclists at the 2016 Summer Olympics
Medalists at the 2014 Asian Games
21st-century Chinese people